The 1890–91 Football Alliance was the second season of the Football Alliance, an association football league which was set up in England as an alternative to the Football League, which had begun in the 1888–89 season.

Stoke joined the Alliance in this season after dropping out of the Football League at the end of the previous season and were crowned champions after the penultimate round of fixtures on 4 April. Last season's champions The Wednesday finished bottom after losing thirteen games in a dreadful season.  Even a 4–2 win (3–0 at half time) at home to runners up Sunderland Albion on the last day of the season failed to lift Wednesday off the foot of the table.

At the end of the season, Stoke were elected back to the Football League along with sixth-placed Darwen, while Sunderland Albion left to join the Northern League.

Final league table

Results

Election to the Football League 
The number of clubs in the Football League was to be increased by two for the 1891–92 season. In addition to the four League sides seeking re-election, six non-league clubs (five of them from the Football Alliance) also sought League membership. The voting went as follows:

See also
 1890–91 in English football
 1890 in association football
 1891 in association football

References

1890-91
2